The Portuguese arrived in the Kingdom of Kotte in 1505. By 1518, they had appointed a captain to control the Portuguese-occupied territory called Ceylon on the island of modern-day Sri Lanka. In that time, there were numerous captains until 1551. The post of captain was succeeded by that of the captain-majors in 1551 and by the governor in 1594.

List of captains

See also
 List of monarchs of Sri Lanka
 List of captain-majors of Portuguese Ceylon
 List of captain-generals of Portuguese Ceylon
 History of Sri Lanka

References
 List of heads of state of Sri Lanka at worldstatesmen.org

Ceilao
Ceilao
Ceilao
1518 establishments in Asia
16th-century establishments in Sri Lanka
1551 disestablishments in Asia
16th-century disestablishments in Sri Lanka

pt:Anexo:Lista de governadores portugueses do Ceilão